The 2009 Heineken Open is a tennis tournament played on outdoor hard courts. It is the 34th edition of the Heineken Open, and part of the ATP World Tour 250 series of the 2009 ATP Tour. It took place at the ASB Tennis Centre in Auckland, New Zealand, from 12 January through 17 January 2008. First-seeded Juan Martín del Potro won the singles title.

The announced singles field is headlined by Juan Martín del Potro, David Ferrer, and Robin Söderling. Also announced are defending champion Philipp Kohlschreiber, Nicolás Almagro, Sam Querrey, Albert Montañés and Juan Mónaco.

Finals

Singles

 Juan Martín del Potro defeated  Sam Querrey, 6–4, 6–4
It was del Potro's first title of the year and 5th of his career.

Doubles

 Martin Damm /  Robert Lindstedt defeated  Scott Lipsky /  Leander Paes, 7–5, 6–4

See also
 2009 ASB Classic – women's tournament

References

External links
 Official website
 ATP – tournament profile

 
Heineken Open
2009
2009 in New Zealand tennis
January 2009 sports events in New Zealand